John Digby may refer to:

 Sir John Digby (died 1533), Knight Marshal for Henry VIII
 John Digby (died 1548) (1508–1548), MP for Leicestershire 1539, High Sheriff of Warwickshire and Leicestershire 1539–40
 John Digby, 1st Earl of Bristol (1580–1653), English diplomat and Royalist
 John Digby, 3rd Earl of Bristol (1635–1698), MP for Dorset 1675–1677
 John Digby (1618–1664), MP for Milborne Port in 1640
 John Digby (1668–1728), MP for Newark 1705–08 and MP for East Retford 1713–22
 John Digby (judge) (born 1951), Australian lawyer and judge
 John Digby (Irish politician) (1691–1786), Irish politician